Ian Hamilton Finlay, CBE (28 October 1925 – 27 March 2006) was a Scottish poet, writer, artist and gardener.

Life

Finlay was  born in Nassau, Bahamas, to James Hamilton Finlay and his wife, Annie Pettigrew, both of Scots descent.

He was educated at Dollar Academy in Clackmannanshire and later at Glasgow School of Art. At the age of 13, with the outbreak of the Second World War, he was evacuated to family in the countryside (firstly to Gartmore and then to Kirkudbright). In 1942, he joined the British Army. Finlay was married twice and had two children, Alec and Ailie. He died in Edinburgh. He is buried alone in Abercorn Churchyard in West Lothian. The grave lies in the extreme south-east corner of the churchyard. The gravestone refers to his parents and sister.

Poetry

At the end of the war, Finlay worked as a shepherd, before beginning to write short stories and poems, while living on Rousay, in Orkney. He published his first book, The Sea Bed and Other Stories, in 1958, with some of his plays broadcast on the BBC, and some stories featured in The Glasgow Herald.

His first collection of poetry, The Dancers Inherit the Party, was published in 1960 by Migrant Press with a second edition published in 1962. The third edition, published by Fulcrum Press (London) in 1969, included a number of new poems and was inaccurately described by the publisher as a first edition, which led to a complex legal dispute. Dancers  was included in its entirety in a New Directions annual a few years later.

In 1963, Finlay published Rapel, his first collection of concrete poetry (poetry in which the layout and typography of the words contributes to its overall effect), and it was as a concrete poet that he first gained wide renown. Much of this work was issued through his own Wild Hawthorn Press, in his magazine Poor. Old. Tired. Horse.

Finlay became notable as a poet, when reducing the monostich form to one word with his concrete poems in the 1960s. Repetition, imitation and tradition lay at the heart of Hamilton's poetry, and exploring ' the juxtaposition of apparently opposite ideas'.

Art

Later, Finlay began to compose poems to be inscribed into stone, incorporating these sculptures into the natural environment.
This kind of 'poem-object' features in the garden Little Sparta that he and Sue Finlay created together in the Pentland Hills near Edinburgh. The five-acre garden also includes more conventional sculptures and two garden temples.

In December 2004, in a poll conducted by Scotland on Sunday, a panel of fifty artists, gallery directors and arts professionals voted Little Sparta to be the most important work of Scottish art. Second and third were the Glasgow School of Art by Charles Rennie Mackintosh and The Skating Minister by Henry Raeburn. Sir Roy Strong has said of Little Sparta that it is "the only really original garden made in this country since 1945".

The Little Sparta Trust plans to preserve Little Sparta for the nation by raising enough to pay for an ongoing maintenance fund. Richard Ingleby, Ian Kennedy, Magnus Linklater, and Ann Uppington are trustees.  Former trustees include Ian Appleton, Stephen Bann, Stephen Blackmore, Patrick Eyres, John Leighton, Duncan Macmillan, Victoria Miro, Paul Nesbitt and Jessie Sheeler. 

Finlay's work is notable for a number of recurring themes: a penchant for classical writers (especially Virgil); a concern with fishing and the sea; an interest in the French Revolution; and a continual revisiting of World War II and the memento mori Latin phrase Et in Arcadia ego. His 1973 screenprint of a tank camouflaged in a leaf pattern, Arcadia, referring to the Utopian Arcadia of poetry and art (another recurring theme), is described by the Tate as drawing "an ironic parallel between this idea of a natural paradise and the camouflage patterns on a tank". In the 1982 exhibition The Third Reich Revisited, Nazi iconography featured on architectural drawings by Ian Appleton, with captions by Finlay which could be read as a sardonic critique of Scotland's arts establishment.

Finlay's use of Nazi imagery led to an accusation of neo-Nazi sympathies and anti-semitism. Finlay sued a Paris magazine which had made such accusations, and was awarded nominal damages of one franc. The stress of this situation brought about the separation between Finlay and his wife Sue.

Finlay also came into conflict with the Strathclyde Regional Council over his liability for rates on a byre in his garden, which the council insisted was being used as commercial premises. Finlay insisted that it was a garden temple.

One of the few gardens outside Scotland to permanently display his work is the Improvement Garden in Stockwood Discovery Centre, Luton, created in collaboration with Sue Finlay, Gary Hincks and Nicholas Sloan.

Finlay was nominated for the Turner Prize in 1985. He was awarded honorary doctorates from Aberdeen University in 1987, Heriot-Watt University in 1993 and the University of Glasgow in 2001, and an honorary and/or visiting professorship from the University of Dundee in 1999. The French Communist Party presented him with a bust of Saint-Just in 1991. He received the Scottish Horticultural Medal from the Royal Caledonian Horticultural Society in 2002, and the Scottish Arts Council Creative Scotland Award in 2003. Awarded in the Queen's New Year's Honours list in 2002, Finlay was a CBE.

Finlay's work has been seen as austere, but also at times witty, or even darkly whimsical.

He is represented by the Wild Hawthorn Press, the Archive of Ian Hamilton Finlay, which works closely with the Ingleby Gallery (Edinburgh) and the Victoria Miro Gallery (London) in the U.K.

Collaborators
Finlay's designs were most often built by others. Finlay respected the expertise of sandblasters, engravers and printers he worked with, having approximately one hundred collaborators including Patrick Caulfield, Richard Demarco, Malcolm Fraser, Christopher Hall, Margot Sandeman. He also worked with a host of lettering artists including Michael Harvey and Nicholas Sloan.

Printed works

Sculptures and gardens

A partial list of Finlay sculptures and gardens. A few photographs are reachable through the external links.

 Little Sparta, (with Sue Finlay), Dunsyre, Lanarkshire, Scotland, 1966
 Canterbury sundial, Canterbury, England, University of Kent, near Rutherford College, 1972
 UNDA wall, Schiff, Windflower, Stuttgart, Germany, Max Planck Institute, 1975
 anteboreum, Yorkshire, England, private garden
 sundial, Liège, Belgium, University of Liège, 1976
 sundial, Bonn, Germany, British Embassy, 1979
 Five Columns for the Kröller-Müller, second title: A Fifth Column for the Kröller-Müller, third title: Corot – Saint-Just, tree-column bases named LYCURGUS, ROUSSEAU, ROBESPIERRE, MICHELET, COROT, Otterlo, Holland, Rijksmuseum Kröller-Müller, 1982
 sundial, Cherrybank Gardens, Perth, 1984
 a basket of lemons, a plough of the Roman sort, two oval plaques, Pistoia, Italy, Villa Celle, 1984
 Vienna, Austria, Schweizergarten, 1985
 Brittany, France, Domain de Kerguehennec, 1986
 Eindhoven, Holland, Van Abbemuseum, 1986
 A Remembrance of Annette, with Nicholas Sloan, Münster, Germany, Uberwasser Cemetery, 1987
 UNDA, with Sue Finlay and Nicholas Sloan, San Diego, Stuart Collection, 1987
 Furka Pass, Switzerland, 1987
 Strasbourg, France, Musée d'Art Moderne or Musée des Beaux-Arts, 1988
 Grove of Silence, Vincennes, with Sue Finlay and Nicholas Sloan, Forest of Dean, England, 1988
 Frechen-Bachem, Germany, Haus Bitz, 1988
 Preston, England, Harris Museum and Art Gallery, 1989
 Cologne, Germany, Ungers Private Library, 1990
 bridge columns, Broomielaw, Glasgow, Scotland, 1990
 Ovid wall, Aphrodite herm, tree-plaque, capital, with Nicholas Sloan, Luton, England, Stockwood Park, 1991
 tree-plaque, Hennef, Germany, private garden, 1991
 Lübeck, Germany, Overbeck-Gesellschaft, 1991
 Karlsruhe, Germany, Baden State Library, 1991
 Dudley, England, The Leasowes, 1992
 Six Milestones, The Hague-Zoetermeer, Holland, 1992
 Paris, France, private garden, 1993
 Frankfurt/Main, Germany, Schröder Münchmeyer Hengst & Co, 1994
stone bench, stone plinth, three plaques. pergola, tree-plaque, others, Grevenbroich, Germany, 1995, named: Ian-Hamilton-Finlay-Park 2014
 Foxgloves, with Peter Coates, Durham, UK, Botanical Gardens, 1996
 Shell Research Centre Thornton grounds, Finlay and Pia Simig with or for Latz+Partner, Chester, UK, 1997–
 paving, eight benches, tree plaque, with Peter Coates, Serpentine Gallery, Kensington Gardens, London, UK, 1997
 Fleur de l'Air, with Pia Simig, Peter Coates, Volkmar Herre, Harry Gilonis, John Dixon Hunt, Wild Hawthorn Press, Provence, France, 1997–2003
 Et In Arcadia Ego, with Peter Coates for Stroom, The Hague, Netherlands, 1998 (see Fashion, art, society in Camouflage)
 The Present Order, with Peter Coates, for Barcelona City Council, supported by The British Council, Barcelona, Spain, Park Güell, 1999
 with Peter Coates, Hamburg, Germany, 1999
 benches, with Peter Coates, Erfurt, Germany, Erfurt Federal Labour Court, 1999
 Cythera, with Peter Coates, Lanarkshire, Scotland, Hamilton Palace grounds, 2000
 Six Definitions, Dean Gallery grounds, Edinburgh, Scotland, National Galleries of Scotland, 2001
 Ripple with Peter Coates, Luxembourg, Casino Luxembourg, 2001 or 2002
 with Peter Coates, Neanderthal, Germany, 2002
 with Peter Coates, Carrara, Italy, Carrara International Biennale, 2002
 Basel, Switzerland, with Peter Coates, 2003
 with Peter Coates, St. Gallan, Switzerland, private residence, 2004
 seven Idylls, Dean Gallery allotments, Edinburgh, Scotland, Dean Gallery Allotments Association, 2005
 L'Idylle des Cerises with Pia Maria Simig (with Peter Coates), Ingleby Gallery, Edinburgh, Scotland, preparatory drawings and sculpture, 2005

Books by Finlay
  Original: 1960 Migrant Press, 1961 Wild Hawthorn Press, 1961 Wild Flounder Press, 1969 Fulcrum Press, 1995 or 1996 or 1997 Polygon

Bibliography
  Original: 1960 Migrant Press, 1961 Wild Hawthorn Press, 1961 Wild Flounder Press, 1969 Fulcrum Press, 1995 or 1996 or 1997 Polygon 
 
 
  Original: 1992 MIT Press  or  
   Original: 1994 Chapman Publishing

See also 
Monostich
Concrete poetry

References

Sources
 Eyres, Patrick (1982), The Third Reich Revisited, in Hearn, Sheila G. (ed.), Cencrastus No. 10, Autumn 1982, pp. 23 – 27, 
  
 
 
 
 Craig, Cairns (2010). "Finlay, Ian Hamilton", in Oxford Dictionary of National Biography online,  accessed 29 September 2016. .

External links

Ian Hamilton Finlay papers, 1948–1992, finding aid, Getty Research Institute.
Finding aid to Ian Hamilton Finlay manuscripts at Columbia University. Rare Book & Manuscript Library.

Scottish gardeners
Scottish sculptors
Scottish male sculptors
Scottish short story writers
British Poetry Revival
Commanders of the Order of the British Empire
Landscape or garden designers
Scottish landscape architects
1925 births
2006 deaths
People from Nassau, Bahamas
People educated at Dollar Academy
Scottish contemporary artists
20th-century British sculptors
20th-century Scottish poets
Scottish male poets
20th-century British short story writers
21st-century British short story writers
20th-century British male writers
21st-century British male writers
British Army personnel of World War II
British people of the Colony of the Bahamas